"Time" is the third single from the 1993 album Full Moon, Dirty Hearts, by Australian rock band INXS. The song was written by Andrew Farriss and Michael Hutchence.

The single was only ever released in Japan and Australia as a "Souvenir EP" to coincide with the "Dirty Honeymoon Tour" in Australia and the Southern Hemisphere.

B-sides
The B-sides on the maxi CD single and cassette releases include live performances of "Communication" and "Taste It" from Welcome to Wherever You Are, as well as "The Gift" and "Please" from Full Moon, Dirty Hearts, which were all recorded on 8 May 1993 in Santa Monica, California on the "Get Out of the House" tour.

Track listings
CD maxi single (45099-51582) and cassette maxi single (45099-51584)
 "Time"
 "Communication" (live)
 "The Gift" (live)
 "Please (You Got That ...)" (live)
 "Taste It" (live)

Charts

References

1994 singles
INXS songs
Songs written by Andrew Farriss
Songs written by Michael Hutchence
1994 songs
East West Records singles
Song recordings produced by Mark Opitz